Mountain Wolf Woman, or Xéhachiwinga (April 1, 1884 – November 9, 1960), was a Native American woman of the Ho-Chunk (Winnebago) tribe whose autobiography was one of the earliest firsthand accounts of the experience of a Native American woman.

Biography
She was born April 1, 1884 into the Thunder Clan near Black River Falls, Wisconsin. Her parents were Charles Blowsnake and Lucy Goodvillage. She was brought up in the traditional tribal religion; later, she converted to the Peyote religion (Native American Church) after her second marriage. Traditionally, brothers arranged their sisters’ marriages, but she did not like the man her brothers chose and, after the birth of her second child, she left him and later married a man of her own choosing.

Her autobiography was transcribed by Nancy Oestreich Lurie and translated in consultation with Frances Thundercloud Wentz.  At the time of the interviews for the book, she had eight children, 39 grandchildren, and 11 great-grandchildren. Mountain Wolf Woman was then an early full-length autobiography of an American Indian woman. She died at age 76, on November 9, 1960 at her home in Black River Falls, Wisconsin.

References

1884 births
1960 deaths
20th-century American women writers
Ho-Chunk people
Native American Church
Native American writers
People from Black River Falls, Wisconsin
Writers from Wisconsin
20th-century American non-fiction writers
American autobiographers
Women autobiographers
American women non-fiction writers
20th-century Native Americans
20th-century Native American women